Robert James Williams (12 April 1912 – 14 May 1984) was a South African cricketer who played first-class cricket for Natal between 1930–31 and 1950–51 and was Jock Cameron's deputy wicketkeeper on the 1935 South African tour of England, though he did not play in any Tests.

References

External links

1912 births
1984 deaths
South African cricketers
KwaZulu-Natal cricketers